SS Solomon Juneau (MC hull number 709) was a Liberty ship built in the United States during World War II. Named after Solomon Juneau, one of the founders and the first mayor of Milwaukee, the ship was laid down by California Shipbuilding Corporation at Terminal Island in Los Angeles, and launched on 6 February 1943. It was operated by Weyerhaeuser Steamship Company.

While in the Mediterranean, the SS Solomon Juneau shot down five enemy German aircraft. A German submarine torpedoed the ship in April 1945, blowing two soldiers overboard who were never found. The ship was repaired. Seventeen years later, in 1962, it was scrapped at Panama City, Florida.

See also
 List of Liberty ships (S–Z)
 SS Winona: a Weyerhaeuser ship in World War I

References

 Liberty Ships built by California Shipbuilding Corp., Terminal Island, CA. Accessed November 7, 2010.
 Moore, Arthur R. A Careless Word... A Needless Sinking, American Merchant Marine Museum, 1985, p. 383.
 McClaren, Robert T. Weyerhaeuser Lumber's Unknown Fleet. Sea Classics, v. 43, n. 7, Jul. 2010.

External links
 Gun crew at Treasure Island, March 1943

 

Liberty ships
Ships built in Los Angeles
1943 ships
Weyerhaeuser